Croatia participated at the 2015 European Games, in Baku, Azerbaijan from 12 to 28 June 2015.

Medalists

Archery

Badminton

Croatia has qualified 5 athletes.

Men
Zvonimir Đurkinjak
Zvonimir Hölbling

Women
Katarina Galenić
Staša Poznanović
Dorotea Šutara

Boxing

Croatia has qualified 5 athletes.

 Men's −60kg – Matteo Komadina
 Men's −64kg – Stipan Prtenjača
 Men's −75kg – Sanjin-Pol Vrgoč
 Men's −91kg – Marko Čalić
 Men's +91kg – Marin Mindoljević

Canoeing

Croatia has qualified 2 athletes.

Men
Antun Novaković

Women
Brigita Bakić

Cycling

Croatia has qualified 6 athletes.

Road
 Men's road race – Kristijan Đurasek, Robert Kišerlovski, Matija Kvasina
 Men's time trial – 1 quota place
 Women's road race – Mia Radotić

Mountain bike
 Men's cross-country – Filip Turk
 Women's cross-country – Andrea Kiršić

Diving

Croatia has qualified 4 athletes.

Men
Hrvoje Brezovac
Juraj Melša

Women
Maja Borić
Lorena Tomiek

Fencing

Croatia has qualified 1 athlete.

 Men's individual foil – Bojan Jovanović
 Women's individual foil – Marcela Dajčić

Gymnastics

Croatia has earned following quota places.

Artistic
 Men's – Marijo Možnik
 Women's – Ana Đerek, Dina Madir, Ana Poščić

Judo

Croatia has qualified 6 athletes.

Men
Zlatko Kumrić
Tomislav Marijanović

Women
Andreja Đaković
Ivana Maranić
Barbara Matić
Marijana Mišković

Karate

Croatia has qualified 6 athletes.

 Men's −67kg – Danil Domdjoni
 Women's −50kg – Monika Berulec
 Women's −55kg – Jelena Kovačević
 Women's −61kg – Ana Lenard
 Women's +68kg – Maša Martinović
 Women's kata – Vlatka Kiuk

Shooting

Croatia has qualified 12 athletes.

Men
Bojan Đurković
Anton Glasnović
Josip Glasnović
Petar Gorša
Željko Posavec
Saša Špirelja
Ivica Štritof

Women
Maša Berić
Marija Marović
Snježana Pejčić
Tanja Perec
Vlatka Pervan

Swimming

Croatia has qualified 9 athletes.

Men
Bruno Blašković
Borna Jukić
Kristian Komlenić
Igor Kostovski
Ante Lučev
Nikola Miljenić
Nikola Obrovac

Women
Kristina Miletić
Matea Sumajstorčić

Table tennis

Croatia has qualified 5 athletes.

Men
Andrej Gaćina
Tomislav Kolarek
Tan Ruiwu

Women
Lea Rakovac
Tian Yuan

Taekwondo

Croatia has qualified 6 athletes.

 Men's −68kg – Filip Grgić
 Men's +80kg – Vedran Golec
 Women's −49kg – Lucija Zaninović
 Women's −57kg – Ana Zaninović
 Women's −67kg – Marina Sumić
 Women's +67kg – Iva Radoš

Triathlon

Croatia has qualified 3 athletes.

 Men's – Matija Lukina, Matija Krivec
 Women's – Sonja Škevin

Volleyball

Croatia has qualified 12 athletes.

 Women's indoor – 1 team of 14 athletes

Water polo

Croatia has qualified 13 athletes.

 Men's indoor – 1 team of 13 athletes

Wrestling

Croatia has qualified 6 athletes.

Men
Dominik Etlinger
Danijel Janečić
Ivan Lizatović
Božo Starčević
Nenad Žugaj
Neven Žugaj

References

Nations at the 2015 European Games
European Games
2015